The frame in psychotherapy and psychoanalysis refers to the environment and relationship which enables the patient to be open about their life with the therapist, and in a secure and confidential manner make a change. It is one of the most important elements in psychotherapy and counseling.

While the psychoanalyst Robert Langs did not coin the term, he did make it famous. The "frame" is an image meant to express the setting of boundaries or ground rules for the contractual aspects of therapy.

Significance
Success in psychotherapy and counselling has been associated with the therapeutic relationship between the client and the therapist. It reflects the genuineness in the relationship between the two.

Robert Langs writes, "The therapist management of the ground rules of psychotherapy constitute his or her most fundamental arena of intervention, and the therapists efforts in this regard will greatly influence all of the other dimensions of the therapeutic interaction and experience".

The Swedish psychoanalyst Claes Davidson, who thoroughly studied Langs, has taken the frames of psychoanalysis and psychotherapy even further and concludes that most of today's clients' prime problems are not found in the deep unconscious domain, but in the conscious and/or the preconscious ones. These (pre-)conscious conflicts, as Davidson names them, will manifest themselves in the clients' frame deviations, where they for resolution have to be addressed by the active therapist.

References

Further reading

Mental Health Therapist - Cousinpattherapy

Psychotherapy
Psychoanalysis